The Vines is a suburb of Perth, Western Australia, developed as a country club estate in 1987. Homes consist of mostly large lots of  situated around the golf courses. It is in the Swan Valley region of Western Australia, and was approved as a suburb name in 1996.

The Vines is home to a four-star resort and country club that encompasses two hotels: the Novotel Vines and the Sebel Swan Valley. The resort hosts two 18-hole golf courses, which traverse the suburb; both are world class championship courses: The Lakes and Ellenbrook.

The Vines Resort and Country Club has been host to international golf tournaments: the Heineken Classic 1993–2001, Johnnie Walker Classic 2006 and 2009, and the Lexus Cup 2007.

References

External links
The Vines Resort & Country Club
City of Swan: Suburbs - The Vines

Suburbs of Perth, Western Australia
Vines
Suburbs and localities in the City of Swan